Samavak (also Romanized as Samāvak) is a village in Chah Dasht Rural District, Shara District, Hamadan County, Hamadan Province, Iran. At the 2006 census, its population was 157, in 29 families.

References 

Populated places in Hamadan County